The 1893 Yale Bulldogs football team represented Yale University in the 1893 college football season. The team finished with a 10–1 record and, despite losing to Princeton, was retroactively named as the national champion by one selector, Parke H. Davis. Yale's 1893 season was part of a 37-game winning streak that began with the final game of the 1890 season and stopped at the end of the 1893 season.

Schedule

References

Yale
Yale Bulldogs football seasons
College football national champions
Yale Bulldogs football